Pouytenga is a department or commune of Kouritenga Province in eastern Burkina Faso. Its capital is the town of Pouytenga. According to the 2019 census the department had a total population of 118,511.

Towns and villages
 Pouytenga (96 469 inhabitants) (capital)
 Belmin (715 inhabitants) 
 Dassambin (462 inhabitants) 
 Goghin (687 inhabitants)  
 Gorbilin (329 inhabitants) 
 Gorkassinghin (251 inhabitants) 
 Kalwartenga (1 681 inhabitants) 
 Konlastenga (605 inhabitants) 
 Kourit-Bil-Yargo (1 280 inhabitants) 
 Kourityaoghin (414 inhabitants) 
 Léamtenga (683 inhabitants) 
 Nimpougo (942 inhabitants) 
 Noéssin (1141 inhabitants) 
 Pelga (1 791 inhabitants) 
 Pouytenga-Peulh (103 inhabitants) 
 Signenoghin (806 inhabitants) 
 Zaongo (272 inhabitants) 
 Zoré (2 732 inhabitants)

References

Departments of Burkina Faso
Kouritenga Province